The Catholic Church in the (Trans)Caucasian former Soviet republics Armenia, Azerbaijan and Georgia consists solely of pre-diocesan Latin (missionary) and Eastern Catholic jurisdictions, which are all exempt, i.e. directly dependent on the Holy See (and its Roman Congregation for the Evangelization of Peoples for the Latin missions or its Roman Congregation for the Oriental Churches for the Eastern Catholics, notably Armenian), without any ecclesiastical province or (national) episcopal conference, all but one (in Azerbaijan) transnational :

 Two Latin, pre-diocesan :
 an apostolic administration
 an apostolic prefecture 
 One Eastern Catholic : an Armenian Catholic Ordinariate for Eastern Catholic faithful.

There are also an Apostolic Nunciature (embassy-level) to Azerbaijan, an Apostolic Nunciature to Armenia and an Apostolic Nunciature to Georgia (in national capital Tbilisi, into which both other are vested), as papal diplomatic representation.

Current jurisdictions

Current Latin 
 Apostolic Administration of the Caucasus, for Georgia (see in national capital Tbilisi) and Armenia 
 Apostolic Prefecture of Baku, for Azerbaijan

Current Eastern Catholic  : Armenian Catholic church 
(Armenian rite in Armenian language)

 Ordinariate for Armenian Catholics in Eastern Europe covering Armenia and Georgia, as well as Russia and Ukraine (all former USSR)

Defunct jurisdictions

Titular sees 
Only in Georgia :
 One Metropolitan Titular archbishoprics : Phasis (Poti)
 Two Archiepiscopal Titular archbishoprics : Sebastopolis in Abasgia, Soteropolis
 Five Episcopal Titular bishoprics : Petra in Lazica, Rhodopolis (Vartsikhe), Sæsina, Tiflis (modern capital as Tbilisi), Zygana

Other 
(excluding mere predecessors of present jurisdictions)

 Roman Catholic Archdiocese of Nakhchivan (Nachitschewan) covered present Armenia and Azerbaijan

See also 
 List of Catholic dioceses (structured view)
 Catholicism in Armenia
 Catholicism in Azerbaijan
 Catholicism in Georgia

Sources and external links 
 GCatholic - Armenia
 GCatholic - Azerbaijan
 GCatholic - Georgia

Transcaucasia